The Serpent Is Rising is the third album by American band Styx, released in October 1973, a mere three months after their previous album Styx II in July 1973.

The album was reissued in 1980 with new artwork and a new title, Serpent.

The album peaked at #192 on the Billboard 200, their second-lowest charting album, and as of 2007 has sold fewer than 100,000 copies worldwide.

Songs and reception
Described as a loose concept album, The Serpent Is Rising contains a number of sexual innuendos.  The baroque prog "The Grove of Eglantine" (written by DeYoung) was about a woman's vagina. It has some harpsichord and accordion, to give a British/European sound.

The proggish title track was written by John Curulewski, is about the serpent beginning to rise. Musically, it has some King Crimson influence especially on their debut album.

The screaming spoken word "Krakatoa" by Curulewski was named for the volcano event of the same name in 1883.  It features an ending glissando which was taken from a Beaver and Krause track called "Spaced" in 1970, for which they were credited on the album.

The acoustic bluesy track "As Bad as This" by Curulewski has a hidden track called "Plexiglas Toilet" which is a calypso humor about a boy who is sitting on a Plexiglas toilet and having problems. The track features only Curulewski and the Panozzo brothers. The song was played on the Dr. Demento radio show and "Weird Al" Yankovic supposedly loved it.

The album also includes James Young rockers "Witch Wolf" and "Young Man", the upbeat "Winner Take All" (written by DeYoung and sung by Young) and the boogie-woogie track "22 Years" (written by Curulewski but sung as a duet by DeYoung and Young); the outro for that track features the producer and president of Wooden Nickel records Bill Traut on saxophone.

The prog rocker "Jonas Psalter" was written by DeYoung and sung by Young. Lyrically, it was about pirates. Musically, it has elements of the contemporary sound of Yes, and also featured a Moog synthesizer.

The album finished with Handel's Hallelujah classical piece, features all the band members singing and DeYoung played a pipe organ on cathedral in Chicago.

Styx considers The Serpent Is Rising to be their worst recording. Dennis DeYoung is indirectly quoted as saying it was "one of the worst recorded and produced in the history of music."

Track listing

Personnel

Styx
 Dennis DeYoung – vocals, keyboards, accordion
 James "JY" Young – vocals, electric guitars
 John Curulewski – vocals, electric and acoustic guitars, synthesizers 
 Chuck Panozzo – bass guitar, backing vocals on "Hallelujah Chorus"
 John Panozzo – drums, percussion, backing vocals on "Hallelujah Chorus"

Additional personnel
Bill Traut – saxophone on "22 Years"

Production
 Producers: Styx, Barry Mraz
 Engineer: Barry Mraz
 Cover art: Dennis Pohl

Charts
Album - Billboard (United States)

References

External links 
 Styx - The Serpent Is Rising (1973) album review by Lindsay Planer, credits & releases at AllMusic.com
 Styx - The Serpent Is Rising (1973) album releases & credits at Discogs.com
 Styx - The Serpent Is Rising (1973) album to be listened as stream at Spotify.com

1973 albums
Concept albums
Styx (band) albums